Harry Vetro (born August 28, 1995) is a Canadian drummer and composer. He has recording credits with such Canadian jazz players as Mike Murley, Steve Wallace and Lina Allemano. In January 2020, Harry was the runner-up for the CJSF 90.1 FM 9th Julian Award of Excellence.

Vetro has received multiple grants from Canada Council for the Arts, Ontario Arts Council, and FACTOR (The Foundation Assisting Canadian Talent on Recordings).

Career

Vetro's band, Harry Vetro's Northern Ranger has been noted by the Calgary Herald as "some of the top players in Canada, [who] are very dedicated to bringing jazz to different communities and really trying to expand the art form.” Northern Ranger's influences range from Gordon Lightfoot, The Band, and Fleet Foxes to Bill Frisell, Kenny Wheeler and Brad Mehldau. The band released a self-titled album in 2018, which reached the National Jazz charts in Canada.

In late 2019, Starbucks discovered Vetro's song "Buffalo Jump" on Spotify. The song was added to the “Starbucks Jazz” Spotify playlist, and Vetro is the only contemporary Canadian Jazz musician featured on that playlist.

Vetro is also a member of the Toronto-band Harrison² (pronounced Harrison Squared) with Harrison Argatoff, Mike Murley, and Steve Wallace. That group released the album Trout in Swimwear in 2020; the album received positive reviews from the jazz press. Stuart Broomer of The Wholenote Magazine stated: "The absence of a chordal instrument opens up the music, encouraging the saxophonists’ dialogue and heightening Wallace and Vetro's presence. It puts Wallace's strong lines in the foreground and adds more room for his sculpted solos; Vetro is a very good drummer, precise and assertive with a keen sense of form."

Discography

References

1995 births
Living people
Canadian male drummers
Canadian male composers
Musicians from Mississauga
21st-century Canadian composers
21st-century Canadian drummers
21st-century Canadian male musicians